Michel Jules Lodewijk Knuysen (25 October 1929 – 6 May 2013) was a Belgian rower who competed in the 1952 Summer Olympics and in the 1956 Summer Olympics. He was born in Wijnegem. In 1952 he won the silver medal with his partner Bob Baetens in the coxless pairs event. Four years later he was eliminated with his partner Bob Baetens in the repêchage of the coxless pair competition.

External links
Michel Knuysen's profile at Sports Reference.com
Michel Knuysen's obituary 

1929 births
2013 deaths
Belgian male rowers
Olympic rowers of Belgium
Rowers at the 1952 Summer Olympics
Rowers at the 1956 Summer Olympics
Olympic silver medalists for Belgium
Olympic medalists in rowing
Medalists at the 1952 Summer Olympics
European Rowing Championships medalists
People from Wijnegem
Sportspeople from Antwerp Province
20th-century Belgian people